"Bridge over Troubled Water" is a song by the American folk duo Simon & Garfunkel, released in January 1970 as the second single from their fifth studio album, Bridge over Troubled Water (1970). It was composed by Paul Simon and produced by Simon & Garfunkel and Roy Halee.

"Bridge over Troubled Water" features lead vocals by Art Garfunkel and a piano accompaniment influenced by gospel music, with a "Wall of Sound"-style production. It was the last song recorded for the album, but the first completed. The instrumentation, provided by the Wrecking Crew, was recorded in California, while Simon and Garfunkel's vocals were recorded in New York. Simon felt Garfunkel should sing solo, an invitation Garfunkel initially declined. Session musician Larry Knechtel performs piano, with Joe Osborn playing bass guitar and Hal Blaine on drums.

The song won five awards at the 13th Annual Grammy Awards in 1971, including Grammy Award for Record of the Year and Song of the Year. It is Simon & Garfunkel's most successful single, and it is often considered their signature song; it topped the US Billboard Hot 100 chart for six weeks, and also reached number one in the United Kingdom, Canada, France and New Zealand. It reached the top five in eight other countries, eventually selling over six million copies worldwide. It became one of the most performed songs of the 20th century, covered by over 50 artists, including Elvis Presley, Aretha Franklin and Johnny Cash. It is ranked number 66 on Rolling Stones 500 Greatest Songs of All Time.

Background
"Bridge over Troubled Water" was composed by Paul Simon in early 1969; the song came to him very quickly, so much so that he asked himself: "Where did that come from?  It doesn't seem like me."  The title concept was inspired by Claude Jeter's line "I'll be your bridge over deep water if you trust in my name," which Jeter sang with his group, the Swan Silvertones, in the 1959 song "Mary Don't You Weep." According to gospel producer and historian Anthony Heilbut, Simon acknowledged his debt to Jeter in person, and handed Jeter a check. Simon named Johann Sebastian Bach's "O Sacred Head, Now Wounded" as inspiration for parts of the melody. Simon wrote the song initially on guitar but transposed it to the piano to reflect the gospel influence and suit Garfunkel's voice.

Simon told his partner, Art Garfunkel, that Garfunkel should sing it alone, the "white choirboy way", though Simon adds harmony on the final verse. Garfunkel felt it was not right for him; he liked Simon's falsetto on the demo and suggested that Simon sing. At the suggestion of Garfunkel and producer Roy Halee, Simon wrote an extra verse and a "bigger" ending, though he felt it was less cohesive with the earlier verses. The final verse was written about Simon's then-wife Peggy Harper, who had noticed her first gray hairs ("Sail on, silvergirl"). It does not refer to a drug abuser's hypodermic needle, as is sometimes claimed. The verse was Garfunkel's idea, but Simon reportedly did not like it.

"Bridge over Troubled Water" was the final track recorded for the album but the first completed, with an additional two weeks of post-production. Simon initially composed the song in G major, but arranger and composer Jimmie Haskell transposed the song to E-flat major to suit Garfunkel's voice. The song's instrumental parts were recorded in August 1969 in California, to make it easier for Garfunkel to go to Mexico to film Catch-22. Simon wanted a gospel piano sound, and hired session musician Larry Knechtel. Joe Osborn played two separate bass tracks, one high and the other low. A string section entering in the third verse completed the arrangement. The drums were played by Hal Blaine in an echo chamber to achieve a hall effect and Los Angeles session percussionist Gary Coleman played the Vibraphone. The arranger Ernie Freeman labelled his string arrangement as "Like a Pitcher of Water".

Simon and Garfunkel returned to New York in November 1969 to record the vocals. The vocal style in "Bridge over Troubled Water" was inspired by Phil Spector's technique in "Old Man River" by The Righteous Brothers. Simon said it sounded like the Beatles' "Let It Be", stating in a Rolling Stone interview: "They are very similar songs, certainly in instrumentation."

As their relations frayed preceding their 1970 breakup, Simon began to experience regret for allowing Garfunkel to sing it solo:

Personnel
 Art Garfunkel – lead vocals
 Paul Simon – backing vocals
 Larry Knechtel – piano
 Joe Osborn – bass guitar
 Hal Blaine – drums and percussion
 Gary Coleman – vibraphone
 Jimmie Haskell, Ernie Freeman – string arrangements

Commercial performance
Despite the song's five-minute length, Columbia decided to release "Bridge over Troubled Water" for play on pop radio. AM radio had previously played Bob Dylan's "Like a Rolling Stone" in 1965, despite its running over the conventional three-minute playtime limit. This figured in Columbia's decision to release the five minute version of "Bridge over Troubled Water" as a single. It reached number one on the Billboard Hot 100 chart on February 28, 1970, and stayed at the top of the chart for six weeks. "Bridge over Troubled Water" also topped the adult contemporary chart in the US for six weeks. Billboard ranked it as the No. 1 song for 1970.

The song was certified Gold for over one million copies in the US by the Recording Industry Association of America, and sold over six million copies worldwide.

Awards 
The single won the Grammy Award for Record of the Year, Song of the Year, Best Contemporary Song, and Best Arrangement, Instrumental and Vocals in the Grammy Awards of 1971, with its album also winning Album of the Year.

Charts and certifications

Weekly charts

Year-end charts

All-time charts

Certifications

US chart performance
"Bridge over Troubled Water" entered the Billboard Hot 100 top 40 at no.13 on February 9, 1970. It jumped to no.3 the following week before climbing to no.1.
During a six-week run at the top – the most for any single that year – Simon and Garfunkel held off strong competition from Creedence Clearwater Revival ("Travelin' Band") and The Jaggerz ("The Rapper"). Then, on April 11, the song fell to no.5 – replaced by The Beatles' "Let It Be". "Bridge over Troubled Water" concluded a 13-week run in the US top 40 on 9 May as their follow-up hit "Cecilia" began its rise to no.4.

UK chart performance
As in the US, "Bridge over Troubled Water" made its UK top 40 bow at no.13, on February 28, 1970. The song climbed steadily over the next four weeks before claiming no.1 on March 28. During a three-week stay at the top, it held off strong competition from Mary Hopkin with "Knock, Knock Who's There?" and "Can't Help Falling in Love" by Andy Williams.
Then, on April 18, the song fell to no.2 – replaced by "All Kinds of Everything" by Dana.
In total, "Bridge over Troubled Water" spent seventeen weeks in the UK top 40 (concluding on June 27).

Covers
"Bridge over Troubled Water" has been covered by over 50 artists, including Elvis Presley and Willie Nelson. Merry Clayton recorded a version in gospel style on her 1970 album Gimme Shelter. A cover recorded by Johnny Cash and Fiona Apple for Cash's American IV: The Man Comes Around album was nominated for the Grammy Award for Best Country Collaboration with Vocals in 2003.

Aretha Franklin
Aretha Franklin's gospel-inspired cover version was released in March 1971 on Atlantic 45-2796 and reached number one on the US R&B chart and number six on the pop chart. The single was certified gold by the RIAA selling two million copies and later won the Grammy Award for Best Female R&B Vocal Performance in the 1972 awards. The single is 3:18 in length. The longer studio version, 5:31 in length, that appears on numerous compilations was first released on Franklin's 1971 compilation Aretha's Greatest Hits. Her version was included on Greatest Moments, Volume III: Various Artists. Franklin also debuted her version at the 1971 Grammy Awards.

Elvis Presley
Elvis Presley recorded it in Nashville on June 5, 1970, and it was released on the 1970 album That's the Way It Is (with a false audience fade-out). He included it in his set list for his next engagement in Las Vegas, which included the filming of the 1970 documentary Elvis: That's the Way It Is, and the song was included in the original theatrical release (included version is from the August 11 dinner show). During that summer season in Vegas, Paul Simon attended one of the shows, and, after seeing Elvis perform the song, he was reported to have said, "That's it, we might as well all give up now." Presley continued to use this song throughout his live performances, including his final live appearance in Indianapolis on June 26, 1977. Another live performance was seen in the Golden Globe-winning documentary Elvis on Tour, filmed at the Greensboro Coliseum in Greensboro, North Carolina, on April 14, 1972. Elvis even sang it at one of his Madison Square Garden Shows back in June 1972.

On the studio version, Robert Matthew Watson wrote in his book Heartbreak Hotel: "Presley's outstanding singing is not disguised. This is a fabulous version, burning with sincerity and power, and finding depths not revealed by the composers."

Chet Atkins and Jerry Reed
Chet Atkins and Jerry Reed recorded an instrumental version of the song and released it on their 1970 album "Me & Jerry". The song appears as the second song on the album's first side and features both Reed and Atkins playing guitar trading lines back and forth with each other. The album and their rendition of the song received generally positive reviews with the former going on to win the 1971 Grammy Award for Best Country Instrumental Performance.

Linda Clifford

Linda Clifford, Curtis Mayfield's protegée signed on his Curtom label, released an up-tempo disco version of "Bridge over Troubled Water" on her album Let Me Be Your Woman in March 1979. This epic version (10:20 in length) was produced by Gil Askey (jazz trumpet player and musical director for many Motown acts) and mixed by Jimmy Simpson, brother of Valerie Simpson from Ashford and Simpson. The song has two originalities, the first one being a 132 bpm tempo (considered the ideal tempo for disco dancing) when the Simon and Garfunkel original is 82 bpm and Aretha Franklin's cover is 76 bpm. It was the first time that this song was covered with a fast tempo. It also has a highly original "Brazilian cuica on a disco beat" break. It became a US disco number 11, pop number 41, R&B number 49 and UK number 28.

P.J.B. featuring Hannah and Her Sisters version

In 1991, P.J.B. featuring Hannah and Her Sisters, a UK group assembled by British songwriter, record producer and author Pete Bellotte and fronted by British singer Hannah Jones, released a dance cover of "Bridge over Troubled Water" which reached number 21 on the UK Singles Chart. The group appeared on Top of the Pops as the opening act on the 26 September 1991 episode.

Charts

Clay Aiken version

In 2003, American Idol season two runner-up Clay Aiken performed "Bridge over Troubled Water" during the competition. After the final results were announced, RCA Records released the song as a double A-side single with "This Is the Night" in Canada in New Zealand; in the US, "This Is the Night" was credited as a solo release since it received a higher cumulative airplay audience. The double A-side charted at number one in both Canada and New Zealand, earning a sextuple-platinum sales certification in the former country and a platinum disc in the latter. On New Zealand's year-end chart for 2003, the single was ranked at number 38.

Charts

Cantonese version
A rewriting of the song with Cantonese lyrics ("Many hearts prevail" – :zh:滔滔千里心) was collectively sung by many Hong Kong singers for public shows in Hong Kong to raise funds after the Eastern China flood of 1991. In 2009 it was also used in the Artistes 88 Fund Raising Campaign for the victims of Typhoon Morakot.

Dami Im version
Dami Im covered this song during the Family Heroes-themed sixth live show of the fifth season of Australian X Factor on September 29, 2013. Im's performance of the song debuted at number 15 on the Australian Singles Chart. Im later released a version of the song on her self-titled album, which debuted at number 1 in Australia, and was certified Platinum.

Artists for Grenfell Tower charity single 

To raise money for the families of the victims of the Grenfell Tower fire in June 2017 and for The London Community Foundation, Simon Cowell arranged the recording and release of a charity single on June 21, 2017. London-born grime artist Stormzy featured prominently, having written a fresh 16-line intro to the song which specifically referenced the tragedy. The recording reached number one on the UK Singles Chart on June 23, 2017, and was certified gold by the BPI on January 31, 2020. The artists were awarded with the Power of Music Award at the 2017 MTV Europe Music Awards.

Artists 

The song was performed by the following artists (in order of appearance):

Vocals

Instruments 

 Brian May (of Queen) – guitar
 Nile Rodgers – guitar
 Tokio Myers – piano
 Pete Townshend (of The Who) – guitar

Charts

Other covers

 Peggy Lee covered the song on her 1970 album, Bridge Over Troubled Water.
 Willie Nelson covered the song in the closing ceremony of the 2002 Winter Olympics in Salt Lake City.
 Italian singer-songwriter, composer, and filmmaker Franco Battiato covered the song and included it on the 2008 album :it:Fleurs 2.
 Mary J. Blige, David Foster, and Andrea Bocelli performed the song on January 31, 2010, during the 52nd Grammy Awards ceremony, in the context of raising awareness for the victims of the Haiti earthquake. This version reached number 75 on the US Billboard Hot 100.
 On December 9, 2013, Tessanne Chin covered the song on season 5 of NBC's singing competition The Voice for the semifinal round. The song went to the number one spot on iTunes within 12 hours, with her becoming the first contestant to achieve the top chart position at the end of an applicable voting window that season.
"A Bridge over You", a charity single recorded and released independently by the Lewisham and Greenwich NHS Choir, the choir of the Lewisham and Greenwich NHS Trust located in south-east London, was a mashup of "Bridge over Troubled Water" and Coldplay's 2005 single "Fix You", with additional arrangement by the choir's conductor, Peter Mitchell. It reached number one on the UK Singles Chart at Christmas 2015.
In August 2019, Kodi Lee covered the song on America's Got Talent in the quarter-finals of the competition. Simon Cowell revealed that Paul Simon personally signed off to allow him to sing the song within thirty minutes of the show asking for permission.
Irish musician Hozier performed the song for the RTÉ fundraising special RTÉ Does Comic Relief in Croke Park. The performance was dedicated to those who died during the COVID-19 pandemic.
Matt Bellamy from Muse released a cover on September 8, 2020, noting it is one of his "favorite songs of all time...We should all reach out and be there for our friends right now!" 
In 2022 Beijing Winter Olympics, the gold medalist pair of pair skating, Sui Wenjing & Han Cong, adapted the mixed cover of this song, by Linda Eder and John Legend, in their free skating programme with a stunning score, 155.47 points.       and Bebe and Cece Winans covered song by Bridge Over Troubled Water by album Heaven

References

Sources

External links
 , Paul Simon, composer; sung by Art Garfunkel

1970 songs
1970 singles
1970s ballads
1971 singles
1979 singles
1991 singles
Songs written by Paul Simon
Simon & Garfunkel songs
Aretha Franklin songs
Anthony Callea songs
Linda Clifford songs
Song recordings produced by Roy Halee
Song recordings produced by Paul Simon
Song recordings produced by Art Garfunkel
Song recordings with Wall of Sound arrangements
Billboard Hot 100 number-one singles
Cashbox number-one singles
UK Singles Chart number-one singles
RPM Top Singles number-one singles
Canadian Singles Chart number-one singles
Number-one singles in Australia
Number-one singles in New Zealand
Number-one singles in Scotland
Grammy Award for Record of the Year
Grammy Award for Song of the Year
Grammy Hall of Fame Award recipients
Columbia Records singles
Grammy Award for Best Instrumental Arrangement Accompanying Vocalist(s)
RSO Records singles
Syco Music singles
RCA Records singles
Sony BMG singles
CBS Records singles
Dance Pool singles
American pop songs
Gospel songs
Popular songs based on classical music